Around the World in 80 Days is a British travel documentary series made to support the annual BBC Children in Need charity appeal in 2009. It sees twelve celebrities attempt to circumnavigate the globe in eighty days without using air transport, recreating the journey of Phileas Fogg and Michael Palin. Like Fogg and Palin, the journey begins and ends at the Reform Club in London. It was first shown on BBC One and BBC HD in October and November 2009.

Production
The challenge for the celebrities was to travel around the globe in eighty days, starting and ending at the Reform Club in London, re-enacting the challenge made to Phileas Fogg in the 1873 Jules Verne novel, Around the World in Eighty Days, and Around the World in 80 Days with Michael Palin. In each episode, a pair of celebrities travels a single leg of the round-the-world journey, trying to meet the next pair at a handover point in sufficient time, in relay race fashion. The journey could be completed by any means except by flight. At the handover, they pass to the succeeding team a carpet bag containing, amongst other items, a journal and a phone. Each of the celebrity pairs contributed to the journal as their leg of the journey progressed, and ahead of the trip Palin wrote an entry containing advice for the travellers.

Throughout the journey, the celebrities collected various items on their leg of the journey. These were then auctioned to raise money for Children in Need, as was the journal completed by the travellers at the end of the trip.

Episodes

Auction items

UK to Turkey
 Ukulele played by Frank Skinner
 Pudsey bear signed by Frank Skinner
 Pudsey bear signed by Lee Mack

Turkey to Kazakhstan
 Pudsey bear signed by Nick Hewer
 Pudsey bear signed by Saira Khan

Kazakhstan to Mongolia
 Pudsey bear signed by Julia Bradbury
 Pudsey bear signed by Matt Baker

Mongolia to USA
 Selection of paintings by Louise Minchin
 Pudsey bear signed by Bill Turnbull
 Pudsey bear signed by Louise Minchin

USA (California) to USA (Memphis)
 Pink tutu
 Pair of Around the World in 80 Days Boots
 Pudsey bear signed by John Barrowman
 Pudsey bear signed by Myleene Klass

USA to UK
 Shane Ritchie's Outfit from 'Cargo'
 Josie Lawrence's Outfit from 'Cargo'
 Pudsey bear signed by Shane Ritchie
 Pudsey bear signed by Josie Lawrence
 Silver Harmonica

Other
 Around the World in 80 Days Journal
 Around the World in 80 Days Carpet Bag

References

External links
 
 

2009 British television series debuts
2009 British television series endings
2000s British documentary television series
BBC television documentaries
Children in Need
British travel television series
Television shows based on Around the World in Eighty Days
2000s British reality television series
2000s British travel television series